Wiggly Safari is the 14th album by Australian band the Wiggles. It was released in 2002 by ABC Music distributed by Roadshow Entertainment. It was nominated for the 2002 ARIA Music Award for Best Children's Album but lost to Hi-5's Boom Boom Beat.

Track list

Charts

Certifications

Video

"Wiggly Safari" was also released in 2002 with special guests Steve Irwin, Terri Irwin, and Bindi Irwin of The Crocodile Hunter.

Song List
 "The Crocodile Hunter"
 "Australia Zoo"
 "Wobbly Camel"
 "Cocky Want a Cracker"
 "Butterflies Flit"
 "Dorothy Queen of the Roses"
 "Swim With Me"
 "Koala La La"
 "Dingo Tango"
 "You Might Like a Pet"
 "Old Man Emu"
 "Feeding Time"
 "Do the Owl"
 "Kookaburra Choir"
 "Snakes (You Can Look But You Better Not Touch)"
 "We're the Crocodile Band"

Cast
As listed in the closing credits.

The Wiggles are
 Murray Cook
 Jeff Fatt
 Anthony Field
 Greg Page

With special guests
 The Crocodile Hunter Steve Irwin
 Terri Irwin
 Bindi Irwin
Also Featuring 
 Captain Feathersword: Paul Paddick
 Dorothy the Dinosaur: Corrine O'Rafferty
 Wags the Dog: Andrew McCourt
 Henry the Octopus: Reem Hanwell

The Wiggly Dancers
 Chris Luder
 Larissa Wright
 Ben Murray
 Naomi Wallace

Release
The Wiggles Wiggly Safari was released on 8 July 2002 in Australia.

The video was dedicated to the memory of Brian Cannizzaro, a New York City firefighter who was killed in the September 11, 2001 attacks on the World Trade Center.

Notes

References

External links

The Wiggles videos
The Wiggles albums
2002 video albums
2002 albums
Australian children's musical films